Scania strigigrapha is a moth of the family Noctuidae. It is found in the Coquimbo and Araucanía Regions of Chile.

The wingspan is about 36 mm. Adults are on wing in March.

External links
 Noctuinae of Chile

Noctuinae
Fauna of Chile
Moths of South America
Insects of South America
Endemic fauna of Chile